El Color De Los Sueños is the third studio album  by Mexican singer Fey. It was released in November 3, 1998 by Sony Music Entertainment Mexico.

Controversy 
The album was much less successful than the artist's previous album, Tierna La Noche, arguably because of the controversies that came about during this time. Fey's age, marital status and religious beliefs were all questioned intensely by the media, which also criticized Fey's management for wanting to create a diva out of Fey. It was also during this time that the artist's mysterious retirement announcement came about. In later interviews, Fey would go on to blame her retirement on the huge amount of work set on her by her manager, and then-boyfriend, Mauri Stern.

Despite the controversies the album still charted at #1 in Mexico along with many of its singles reaching the top spots.  The album also spun a worldwide successful tour of the same name.  The album to date has sold more than two million copies worldwide.

Track listing 

 "Cielo Líquido" 3:55  (J.R. Florez, David Boradoni)
 "La Madrugada, Tú Y La Radio" 4:09  (J.R. Florez, David Boradoni)
 "Ni Tu Ni Nadie" 4:25  (Mario Ablanedo)
 "La Espuma De Los Días" 4:19 (J.R. Florez, David Boradoni)
 "Díselo Con Flores" 4:06 (J.R. Florez; L. Nutti)
 "Canela" 3:39 (J.R. Florez, David Boradoni)
 "Vuelve" 3:46 (J.R. Florez; J. Giralt)
 "Él" 4:20 (J.R. Florez, David Boradoni)
 "Almíbar" 4:15 (J.R. Florez, David Boradoni)
 "No Tengo Novio" 3:21 (J.R. Florez, David Boradoni)
 "El Color De Los Sueños" 4:46 J.R. Florez; J. Giralt
 "De Corazón A Corazón" 4:31(J.R. Florez, David Boradoni)
 "Flor De Un día" 4:25 (J.R. Florez, David Boradoni)
 "Iye" 0:58 (J.R. Florez, David Boradoni)

Certifications

Singles

References

External links
[ AMG]

Fey (singer) albums
1998 albums